Adama Jammeh may refer to:
 Adama Jammeh (sprinter)
 Adama Jammeh (footballer)